Take a Look is a 1993 album by American singer Natalie Cole, released on June 9, 1993 by Elektra Records. Cole won the Grammy Award for Best Jazz Vocal Performance for Take a Look at the 36th Grammy Awards.

The single, "Take a Look", peaked at No. 68 on the US Billboard R&B chart, and No. 35 the Adult Contemporary chart in 1993.

Track listing

Personnel

Musicians 

 Natalie Cole – lead vocals, backing vocals (5, 7, 10, 14, 16, 17)
 Roger Kellaway – acoustic piano (1, 5, 12)
 Alan Broadbent – acoustic piano (2, 3, 9, 10, 13-15, 17), arrangements (4, 7, 15, 16)
 Clare Fischer – acoustic piano (4) 
 Mike Melvoin – acoustic piano (7, 16)
 Herbie Hancock – acoustic piano (8, 18), Fender Rhodes (11)
 John Chiodini – guitars (1-18), arrangements (14), guitar solo (15) 
 John Clayton – bass (1, 5, 7, 8, 11, 12, 16, 18), arrangements (2, 10, 13)
 Jim Hughart – bass (2-4, 6, 9, 10, 13-15, 17), arrangements (9)
 Jeff Hamilton – drums (1-8, 10-13, 16, 17)
 Harold Jones – drums (9, 15, 18)
 Luis Conte – percussion (14)
 Robert Yancy – percussion (14)
 Larry Bunker – marimba (14), vibraphone (14)
 Pete Christlieb – saxophone solo (2, 17)
 Grover Washington Jr. – saxophone solo (3)
 David "Fathead" Newman – saxophone solo (5, 12)
 David Trigg – trumpet solo (9)
 Marty Paich – arrangements (1, 5, 12, 18)
 Bill Holman – arrangements (3, 6, 17)
 Jeremy Lubbock – arrangements (8, 11)

Production 

 Producers – Tommy LiPuma (Tracks 1, 3, 5, 6, 12, 17, 18); André Fischer (Tracks 2, 4, 7-11, 13-16).
 Executive producers – Natalie Cole and Tommy LiPuma
 Production assistants – Angelo Montrone and Deborah Silverman-Kern (Tracks 1, 3, 5, 6, 12, 17, 18); Patty Nichols and Keith Petrie (Tracks 2, 4, 7-11, 13-16).
 Recorded and mixed by Al Schmitt
 Additional recording – Joe Ferla, Doug Ryder, Bill Schnee and Jeffrey Woodruff.
 Assistant engineers – Chris Albert, Ken Allerdyce, Chris Fogel, John Hendrickson, Richard Landers, Gil Morales, Charlie Paakkari, Marnie Riley, Gary Sulich and Dan Wojnar.
 Mastered by Doug Sax at the Mastering Lab (Hollywood, CA).
 Project coordinator – Shari Sutcliffe
 Art direction – Robyn Lynch
 Design – Drenttel Doyle Partners
 Photography – Matthew Rolston
 Hair – Janet Zeitoun
 Make-up – Rudy Calvo and Tara Posey
 Stylist – Cecille Parker
 Management – Dan Cleary

Charts

Certifications

References

1993 albums
Natalie Cole albums
Albums produced by Tommy LiPuma
Elektra Records albums
Covers albums
Grammy Award for Best Jazz Vocal Album